Myroides injenensis is a Gram-negative and rod-shaped bacterium from the genus of Myroides which has been isolated from human urine.

References

Future reading

 

Flavobacteria
Bacteria described in 2015